The Master of Science in Leadership (MSL) is a master's degree in leadership studies that is offered by a college of business.  It is an alternative to, not a substitute for, the traditional Master of Business Administration (MBA) degree. The MSL degree requirements may include some business/management courses that are required in an MBA program. However, this degree program concentrates heavily on leader-follower interactions, cross-cultural communications, coaching, influencing, team development, leading organizational changes, strategic thinking,  project leadership, and behavioral motivation theories. It does not concentrate on financial or quantitative analysis, marketing, or accounting which are common in MBA programs. The degree program is appealing to businesspeople in well-established careers already. The MSL degree is similar to the Master of Science in Organizational Leadership (MSOL) degree or the Master of Leadership Sciences degree offered by the National School of Leadership in India.

References

Leadership studies
Business qualifications